Aberdeen is a city in Grays Harbor County, Washington, United States. The population was 17,013 at the 2020 census. The city is the economic center of Grays Harbor County, bordering the cities of Hoquiam and Cosmopolis. Aberdeen is occasionally referred to as the "Gateway to the Olympic Peninsula".

History

Aberdeen was named after a local salmon cannery to reflect its Scottish fishing port namesake Aberdeen, and, like Scotland, Aberdeen is situated at the mouth of two rivers - the Chehalis and the Wishkah.

The city was founded by Samuel Benn in 1884 and incorporated on May 12, 1890. Although it became the largest and best-known city in Grays Harbor, Aberdeen lagged behind nearby Hoquiam and Cosmopolis in its early years. When A.J. West built the town's first sawmill in 1894, the other two municipalities had been in business for several years. Aberdeen and its neighbors vied to be the terminus for Northern Pacific Railroad, but instead of ending at one of the established mill towns, the railroad skimmed through Cosmopolis and headed west for Ocosta. Hoquiam and Aberdeen citizens together built a spur; in 1895, the line connected Northern Pacific tracks to Aberdeen.

By 1900, Aberdeen had become home to many saloons, brothels, and gambling establishments. It was nicknamed "The Hellhole of the Pacific", as well as  "The Port of Missing Men" due to its high murder rate. One notable resident was Billy Gohl, known locally as Billy "Ghoul", who was rumored to have killed at least 140 men, disposing of the bodies in the Wishkah River. Gohl was ultimately convicted of two murders.

Aberdeen was hit hard during the Great Depression, which saw the number of major local sawmills reduce from 37 to 9. The timber industry continued to boom, but by the late 1970s most of this resource had been logged and by the early 1990's the industry was decimated due to resource reduction and regulations. Local political and business leaders ignored this fact and did not pursue economic diversification.  Most of the mills had closed down by the 1970s and 1980s.

Aberdeen is also the home port of the tall ship Lady Washington, a reproduction of a smaller vessel used by the explorer Captain Robert Gray, featured in the Pirates of the Caribbean film The Curse of the Black Pearl.

Geography
Aberdeen is at the eastern end of Grays Harbor, near the mouth of the Chehalis River and southwest of the Olympic Mountains. Grays Harbor is notable as the northernmost ria on North America's Pacific Coast because it has remained free of glaciers throughout the Quaternary due to unfavorable topography and warm temperatures. It is thought that, during glacial periods of the Quaternary, the Chehalis River was a major refugium for aquatic species, as was the west coast from the Olympic Peninsula southward for plants that later formed the northern part of the Pacific temperate rainforest in formerly glaciated areas.

Climate
Aberdeen experiences a climate on the boundary between Mediterranean (Köppen Csb) and oceanic (Köppen Cfb). Although rainfall is extremely high between October and March, July and August still have a distinct excess of evaporation over rainfall. Temperatures are generally very mild due to the proximity of the warm Pacific Ocean and the Kuroshio Current. Snow is very common but usually light, with one exception being December 1964 during which  fell. Occasionally, southeasterly winds can cause very high temperatures. For example, in August 1981, the temperature in Aberdeen reached .

Demographics

2010 census
As of the census of 2010, there were 16,896 people, 6,476 households, and 4,020 families residing in the city. The racial makeup of the city was 80.4% White, 0.8% African American, 3.7% Native American, 1.9% Asian, 0.3% Pacific Islander, 8.0% from other races, and 4.9% from two or more races. Hispanic or Latino of any race were 15.8% of the population.

There were 6,476 households, of which 33.1% had children under the age of 18 living with them, 39.9% were married couples living together, 15.0% had a female householder with no spouse present, 7.1% had a male householder with no spouse present, and 37.9% were non-families. 29.2% of all households were made up of individuals, and 10.8% had someone living alone who was 65 years of age or older. The average household size was 2.56 and the average family size was 3.10.

The median age in the city was 35.6 years. 24.9% of residents were under the age of 18; 10.5% were between the ages of 18 and 24; 25.8% were from 25 to 44; 26% were from 45 to 64; and 13% were 65 years of age or older. The gender makeup of the city was 49.8% male and 50.2% female.

2000 census
As of the census of 2000, there were 16,461 people, 6,517 households, and 4,112 families residing in the city. The population density was 1,548.8 people per square mile (597.9/km2). There were 7,536 housing units at an average density of 709.1 per square mile (273.7/km2). The racial makeup of the city was 84.87% White, 0.47% African American, 3.70% Native American, 2.10% Asian, 0.14% Pacific Islander, 5.15% from other races, and 3.57% from two or more races. Hispanic or Latino of any race were 9.22% of the population. 16.4% were of German, 9.3% English, 9.3% American, 8.7% Irish and 5.9% Norwegian ancestry. 90.2% spoke only English, while 7.7% spoke Spanish at home.

There were 6,517 households, out of which 31.8% had children under the age of 18 living with them, 43.9% were married couples living together, 13.7% had a female householder with no husband present, and 36.9% were non-families. 29.5% of all households were made up of individuals, and 12.0% had someone living alone who was 65 years of age or older. The average household size was 2.49 and the average family size was 3.05.

In the city, the population was spread out, with 26.8% under the age of 18, 10.3% from 18 to 24, 27.1% from 25 to 44, 21.9% from 45 to 64, and 14.0% who were 65 years of age or older. The median age was 35 years. For every 100 females, there were 98.0 males. For every 100 females age 18 and over, there were 96.0 males.

The median income for a household in the city was $30,683, and the median income for a family was $37,966. Males had a median income of $32,710 versus $20,446 for females. The per capita income for the city was $16,092. About 16.1% of families and 22.2% of the population were below the poverty line, including 29.7% of those under age 18 and 9.6% of those ages 65 or over.

Industry

Aberdeen and the rest of Grays Harbor remain dependent on timber, fishing, and tourism industries and as a regional service center for much of the Olympic Peninsula. Grays Harbor Community Hospital employees total more than 600 workers.  Historically the area is dependent on harvesting and exporting natural resources. The Port of Grays Harbor is the largest coastal shipping port north of California. It is still a center for the export of logs on the west coast of the U.S. and has become one of the largest centers for the shipment of autos and grains to China and Korea.

On December 19, 2005, Weyerhaeuser made plans to close the Aberdeen large-log sawmill and the Cosmopolis pulp mill, and the closures took effect in early 2006.  This resulted in the loss of at least 342 jobs.  In January 2009, Weyerhaeuser closed two additional plants in Aberdeen, resulting in another 221 lost jobs.  In both cases many employees were not told by Weyerhaeuser management, but learned about the closures from local radio stations who received a press release prior to a scheduled press conference.

Major employers in Grays Harbor include Westport Shipyard, Sierra Pacific Industries, The Simpson Door Company, Hoquiam Plywood, Pasha Automotive, Willis Enterprises, Ocean Gold Companies, Vaughn Company, and the Stafford Creek Corrections Center, a state prison which opened in 2000.

Other significant employers include the cranberry-growing cooperative Ocean Spray, worldwide retailer Walmart, Sidhu & Sons Nursery USA, Inc. (AKA Briggs Nursery), Overstock.com, and Washington Crab Producers.

In 2007, Imperium Renewables of Seattle invested $40 million in the construction of the biodiesel plant at the Port of Grays Harbor.

In September 2010, the Weyerhaeuser Cosmopolis Pulp Mill was purchased by the Beverly Hills-based Gores Group and restarted as Cosmo Specialty Fibers, Inc. They started production of pulp on May 1, 2011.

Retail

The city had two indoor shopping malls that were developed in the 1970s and early 1980s. The Wishkah Mall east of downtown Aberdeen opened in August 1976 on the riverfront and was followed in August 1981 by the South Shore Mall, which was south of the Chehalis River. The newer South Shore Mall had  and space for 80 retailers, including anchor tenants Sears and J.C. Penney following their relocation from downtown. It was renamed to the Shoppes at Riverside in 2016 and closed on February 13, 2021, following an engineering report that found the soil under the foundation had settled and would pose structural risks. A movie theater and fun center remain open in two of the four anchor spaces at the mall, which is owned by Coming Attractions Theaters.

Education

The city's school district has two high schools: J. M. Weatherwax High School, or Aberdeen High School as it is now called; and Harbor High School, an alternative high school with an enrollment exceeding 200 students.  Aberdeen High has a long-time school sports rivalry with nearby Hoquiam High School.

In 2002, the Weatherwax building of Aberdeen High School, built in 1909, burned to the ground in an act of arson. The new building was completed in 2007 and held its grand opening on August 25, 2007.

Aberdeen School District also consists of one junior high: Miller Junior High; five elementary schools: Central Park Elementary, McDermoth Elementary, Stevens Elementary, AJ West Elementary and Robert Gray Elementary; and one Roman Catholic parochial school: St. Mary's Catholic School.

Aberdeen is home to Grays Harbor College, located in south Aberdeen, and is represented by the Charlie Choker mascot.  The college emphasizes student opportunities and has resources to help students transfer to a four-year college to complete a degree.

Aberdeen has the largest public library in Grays Harbor County, which is operated as part of the Timberland Regional Library system. The city originally had a Carnegie library that was opened in 1908 and replaced in 1966 by the current building, which underwent extensive renovations in 2000.

The city's museum was located in a historic armory building that was built in 1922. The building and the museum's collections were destroyed in a major fire in June 2018, including an exhibit on Nirvana. It was the latest of several major fires to have affected Aberdeen.

Crime
According to Uniform Crime Report statistics compiled by the Federal Bureau of Investigation (FBI) in 2017, there were 85 violent crimes and 753 property crimes per 100,000 residents. Of these, the violent crimes consisted of 15 forcible rapes, 22 robberies and 48 aggravated assaults, while 138 burglaries, 554 larceny-thefts, 61 motor vehicle thefts and 6 instances of arson defined the property offenses.

Notable people

 Robert Arthur, actor and gay rights activist
 Elton Bennett, artist
 Mark Bruener, NFL football player 
 Trisha Brown, choreographer
 Jeff Burlingame, journalist and author
 Robert Cantwell, novelist
 Colin Cowherd, sports media personality
 Bryan Danielson, professional wrestler
 Calvin Fixx, writer
 Lee Friedlander, artist and photographer
 Billy Gohl, labor organizer and alleged serial killer
 Carrie Goldberg, attorney, author
 Victor Grinich, pioneer of Silicon Valley
 Gary Steven Krist, criminal best known for the Barbara Mackle kidnapping, was born Aberdeen in 1945
 Walt Morey, writer and creator of Gentle Ben
 Robert Motherwell, painter of New York School
 Ed Murray, Democratic politician and Mayor of Seattle 2014-17
 Peter Norton, computer programmer
 Douglas Osheroff, winner of Nobel Prize in Physics
 Craig Raymond, basketball player, 12th pick of 1967 NBA draft
 Wesley Carl Uhlman, politician
 Hank Woon, author, game designer, screenwriter
 John Workman, writer, artist
 Yukon Eric, professional wrestler

Musicians
 The Doobie Brothers' Patrick Simmons
 Melvins, specifically Dale Crover and Matt Lukin
 Nirvana, specifically Kurt Cobain and Krist Novoselic 
 Kurdt Vanderhoof of Metal Church, the Lewd and Presto Ballet
 Chris Freeman of Pansy Division
Leroy Virgil of Hellbound Glory

Sister cities
  Hakui, Ishikawa, Japan
  Kanazawa, Ishikawa, Japan

References

Further reading
 Jeff Burlingame, "Kurt Cobain: 'Oh Well, Whatever, Nevermind'" Enslow Publishers, 2006.
 Jeff Burlingame, "Moon Olympic Peninsula" Avalon Travel, 2012.
 Anne Cotton, "The History of Aberdeen," Grays Harbor Regional Planning Commission, 1982.
 John C. Hughes & Ryan Teague Beckwith, "On the Harbor: From Black Friday to Nirvana," Stephens Press, LLC. 2005.
 Murray Morgan, "The Last Wilderness," Viking Press, 1955.
 Ed Van Syckle, "The River Pioneers," Pacific Search Press, 1982.
 Ed Van Syckle, "They Tried to Cut It All," Pacific Search Press, 1980.
 Robert A. Weinstein, "Grays Harbor, 1885-1913", Viking Press, 1978
 John Workman, "The Third Man" chapter in "Against the Grain: Mad Artist Wallace Wood" compiled by Bhob Stewart, TwoMorrows Publishing, 2003.
 John Workman, "Betty Being Bad" Fantagraphics Books, 1990.

External links

 Official city website
 

 
Populated places established in 1884
Cities in Washington (state)
Cities in Grays Harbor County, Washington
Micropolitan areas of Washington (state)
Populated coastal places in Washington (state)
1884 establishments in Washington Territory